Chama Cha Mashinani is a political party in Kenya. It is currently headed by veteran politician Isaac Ruto. The Chama Cha Mashinani had four elected members of the Kenyan National Assembly in the 12th Parliament of Kenya.

References

2016 establishments in Kenya
Political parties established in 2016
Political parties in Kenya